The 1915 Akron Indians season was their eight season in existence. The team played in the Ohio League and posted a 1–3–1 record.

Schedule 
The table below was compiled using the information from The Pro Football Archives, which used various contemporary newspapers. For the results column, the winning team's score is posted first followed by the result for the Indians. If a cell is greyed out and has "N/A", then that means there is an unknown figure for that game. Green-colored rows indicate a win; yellow-colored rows indicate a tie; and red-colored rows indicate a loss.

References 

1915
Akron Pros
Akron Pros